Peña Blanca, Peñablanca, or Peñas Blancas may refer to:

Peña Blanca, Guatemala, a village in the municipality of Camotan, Chiquimul
Peña Blanca, New Mexico, United States
Peña Blanca, Los Santos, Panama
Peña Blanca, a mountain in Chile 
Peña Blanca Lake, Arizona, United States
Peñablanca, Cagayan, Philippines
Peñablanca Protected Landscape and Seascape
Peñablanca, community in Villa Alemana, Chile
Peñas Blancas, a municipality in Río Negro Province, Argentina
Peñas Blancas District, in San Ramón Canton, Costa Rica
Peñas Blancas Massif Natural Reserve, Nicaragua

See also
Peña (disambiguation)